The PZL P.6 was a Polish fighter, designed by the engineer Zygmunt Puławski, manufactured by PZL state-owned factory. It remained a prototype and did not go into production.

Design and development
The history of PZL P.6 started in 1928, when a talented designer, Zygmunt Puławski designed an all-metal metal-covered monoplane fighter PZL P.1. It introduced a high gull wing, giving a pilot an optimal view. The P.1 was powered with an inline engine, and developed a speed of 302 km/h, but remained a prototype, because it was decided, that a fighter for the Polish Air Force should be powered with a radial engine, licence produced in Poland. Therefore, the next model PZL P.6, was powered with the Bristol Jupiter VI FH radial engine.

The PZL P.6 was flown for the first time in August 1930 with test pilot Bolesław Orliński at the controls. It had a very similar wing to the P.1, but the fuselage was completely redesigned with a modern semi-monocoque configuration introduced that was oval in cross-section, as well, the  tail was also changed. As a result of the modifications, the aircraft was over 200 kg lighter.

Technical description
The PZL P.6 was an all-metal duralumin-covered, braced, high-wing monoplane. The fuselage was framed in a front section and semi-monocoque in mid and tail sections with an oval cross-section. The two-spar wing of trapezoid shape, thinner by the fuselage, covered with a rimmed Wibault type duralumin sheet, was supported by two struts on either side. The pilot's cockpit was open, with a windshield. The Bristol Jupiter VI FH radial engine mounted in front was fitted with a Townend ring and used a two-blade propeller. The fixed undercarriage with a rear skid was mainly conventional and typical of the period. An unusual feature was a fuselage fuel tank that could be dropped in case of a fire emergency.

Testing and evaluation
The P.6, just like the P.1, garnered a great deal of interest worldwide. Their wing design was called the "Polish wing" or "Puławski wing". During a presentation at the Paris Air Show in Le Bourget in December 1931, the aviation press, such as L'Air, The Aeroplane, Flight and Die Luftwacht acknowledged the P.6 as one of the world's top fighter designs. Significantly, the  P.6 prototype, piloted by Bolesław Orliński, won the American National Air Races in 29 August-7 September 1931.

The PZL P.6 did not enter production, because at the same time the next improved variant, the PZL P.7 was being developed. The first P.7 prototype was basically the P.6 with a more powerful Bristol Jupiter VII F engine. With the provision of a supercharger, it achieved better performance at higher altitudes.

The P.6 prototype crashed on 11 October 1931 near Częstochowa due of a propeller breaking apart, resulting in the engine tearing apart. Pilot, Orliński, bailed out successfully.

Variants
 P.6/I : First prototype, later became P.7 prototype.

Operators

Polish Air Force

Specifications (P.6/I)

See also

References

Further reading

 Cynk, Jerzy B. History of the Polish Air Force 1918-1968. Reading, Berkshire, UK: Osprey Publishing Ltd., 1972. .
 Cynk, Jerzy B. Polish Aircraft, 1893-1939. London: Putnam & Company Ltd., 1971. . 
 Eberspacher, Warren A. and Koniarek, Jan P. PZL Fighters Part One - P.1 through P.8. (International Squadron Monograph 2). St. Paul, MN: Phalanx Publishing Co., Ltd., 1995. .
 Glass, Andrzej. Polskie konstrukcje lotnicze 1893-1939 (in Polish: "Polish Aviation Constructions 1893-1939"). Warszawa, Poland: WKiŁ, 1977. no ISBN
 Glass, Andrzej. PZL P.7: Cz.1. Gdańsk, Poland: AJ Press, 2000. .
 Kopański, Tomasz J. PZL P.7: Cz.2. Gdańsk, Poland: AJ Press, 2001. .

External links

Photos and drawings at Ugolok Neba
Photo at Samoloty 1,5

1930s Polish fighter aircraft
PZL aircraft
Single-engined tractor aircraft
Gull-wing aircraft
Aircraft first flown in 1930